Fouaad Mirza (born 6 March 1992) is an Indian equestrian who won silver medals in both individual eventing and team eventing at the 2018 Asian Games. He became the first Indian since 1982 to win a medal at an individual equestrian event at the Asian Games. Mirza qualified for the 2020 Summer Olympics, becoming the first Indian equestrian since Imtiaz Anees (2000) to participate at the Games.

Early life 
Fouaad Mirza was born in Bangalore, India. His father, Dr Hasneyn Mirza, is one of India's top equine veterinarians and is a sixth generation horseman himself. His family owns a stud farm in Bangalore. He has an elder brother, who is also a veterinarian. Fouaad's interest in horses grew since he was a toddler. He started riding since he was 5 years old.

Career 
At the age of 22, Mirza took part in the 2014 Asian Games, held in Incheon, South Korea. He finished in 5th position in team eventing along with fellow riders Sangram Singh, Mrityunjay Singh Rathore and Ajai Poovaiah. He finished in 10th position in the individual eventing category.

In 2017, Mirza moved to Germany to train with equestrian Bettina Hoy in Warendorf. After Hoy took a coaching position for the Dutch eventing team, he moved to Ganderkesee to train with Sandra Auffarth.

Fouaad Mirza's move to Germany was a turning point in his career. He won two silver medals at the Equestrian Jumping Final at the Asian Games 2018 in Jakarta, one in individual eventing, and one in team eventing along with fellow Indian riders Rakesh Kumar, Ashish Malik and Jitender Singh.  With this feat, Mirza became the first Indian to win an Asian Games medal in Equesterian event after a gap of 36 years.

In 2019, Mirza received the Arjuna Award from the president of India, Ram Nath Kovind.

In October 2019, he won gold at CCI3*-S event held in Strzegom, Poland with his horse Dajara.

On 7 January 2020, Mirza qualified for the 2020 Tokyo Olympics after finishing first in South East Asia, Oceania group. He became the first Indian equestrian in the last 20 years to qualify for the Olympics.
and the first Indian equestrian to reach the finals of the Olympic individual eventing category. He finished in 23rd position aboard the 2006 Westphalian gelding, Seigneur Medicott.

Personal life 
Fouaad Mirza studied psychology in the University of Northampton, Great Britain. He currently resides in Germany and trains under his coach, Sandra Auffarth, who is the winner of the individual bronze medal and team gold medal in 2012 Summer Olympics.

He is sponsored by the Embassy Group, which is a privately held real estate developer based in Bangalore, Karnataka.

References

1992 births
Living people
Indian male equestrians
Sportspeople from Bangalore
Equestrians at the 2014 Asian Games
Equestrians at the 2018 Asian Games
Medalists at the 2018 Asian Games
Asian Games silver medalists for India
Asian Games medalists in equestrian
Recipients of the Arjuna Award
Equestrians at the 2020 Summer Olympics
Olympic equestrians of India